Brookewood School is a private independent day school for girls located in Kensington, Maryland. It is associated with The Avalon School, a private school for boys in Wheaton, Maryland, and the Thomas More Institute, an umbrella program for homeschoolers. It is a Catholic school with a student/teacher ratio of 7:1. Brookewood School recently celebrated its 10-year anniversary in 2016.

References

Girls' schools in Maryland
Private K-12 schools in Montgomery County, Maryland
Catholic secondary schools in Maryland
Kensington, Maryland